Catherine Melain (born 19 May 1974) is a French former basketball player who competed in the 2000 Summer Olympics. She was born in Rennes.

References

1974 births
Living people
Sportspeople from Rennes
French women's basketball players
Olympic basketball players of France
Basketball players at the 2000 Summer Olympics
21st-century French women